Chuck Purgason (born May 19, 1960) was an American politician from the state of Missouri. A Republican, Purgason was an unsuccessful candidate for the United States Senate in 2010 losing the Republican primary to then-U.S. Congressman Roy Blunt.

Purgason was born in West Plains, Missouri, and graduated from West Plains High School in 1978. He is married to Janet Purgason and they have three children: Robert, Tracey, and Cory.  He is the founder and owner of Ozark Awards, Ozark Wings Hatchery and Hunting Preserve, and is a resident of Caulfield, Missouri.

He was a member of the Missouri House of Representatives from 1996 through 2004, serving as his party's Majority Whip.  He was first elected to the Missouri State Senate in 2004.

References
Official Manual, State of Missouri, 2005-2006. Jefferson City, MO: Secretary of State.

1960 births
Living people
People from West Plains, Missouri
Members of the Missouri House of Representatives
Missouri state senators